Minuscule 2444 (in the Gregory-Aland numbering), is a Greek minuscule manuscript of the New Testament, on 309 paper leaves (22 cm by 15 cm). It is dated paleographically to the 13th century. Some leaves of the codex were lost.

Description 
The codex contains the text of the four Gospels with some lacunae. The text is written in one column per page, in 22 lines per page.

The decorated headpieces, the large initials are rubricated and in colour, the small initials in red. It has breathings and accents. The nomina sacra are written in an abbreviated way. Error of itacism is frequent.

There is also another division according to the smaller Ammonian Sections with a references to the Eusebian Canons.

Some notes and textual corrections were made at the margin.

Text 

The Greek text of the codex is a representative of the Byzantine text-type. Kurt Aland did not place it in any Category.

It was not examined by using the Claremont Profile Method.

It contains the Pericope Adulterae (John 7:53-8:11).

In John 21:23 it lacks the phrase divi in the main text, but it was added at the margin.

 John 1:28 – Βηθανια ] βιθαβαρα

History 

The codex now is located in the Bible Museum Münster (Ms. 4).

Gallery

See also 

 List of New Testament minuscules
 Textual criticism

References

External links 

 Bible Museum Manuscripts of the Bible Museum
 Images of manuscript 2444 at the CSNTM

Greek New Testament minuscules
13th-century biblical manuscripts